S. maritima may refer to:
 Sabal maritima, a palm species native to Jamaica and Cuba
 Spartina maritima, the small cordgrass, a cordgrass species native to the coasts of western and southern Europe and western Africa

Synonyms
 Scilla maritima, a synonym for Urginea maritima

See also
 Maritima (disambiguation)